is a Japanese voice actor, singer and narrator from Matsusaka, Mie. He changed his given name from 大輔 to だいすけ on June 1, 2007 with the pronunciation and romanization remaining the same. He joined Aoni Production on April 1, 2014. He used to belong to the Tokyo Actor's Consumer's Cooperative Society (Haikyou) and Horipro and worked as an independent voice actor in between switching agencies. His best known roles include the voice of Jet the Hawk in the Japanese version of the Sonic the Hedgehog series, Loke in Fairy Tail, Cabba in Dragon Ball Super and Fuyuhiko Kuzuryu in the Danganronpa series. His other roles include Taigong Wang in the Warriors Orochi series from 2 to 4 and Sima Zhao in the Dynasty Warriors and Warriors Orochi series.

At the second Seiyu Awards, he has been nominated for "Best Actor in a Leading role", "Best Actor in a Supporting Role" and "Best Radio Personality".

Voice acting units
Kishio is or used to be, a member of several voice acting units (some may have already disbanded), including:
3B with Kanayan (with fellow Kin'iro no Corda cast members Hideo Ishikawa and Masakazu Morita)
Cluster'S (with fellow Cluster Edge main casts Hiro Shimono, Hiroyuki Yoshino and Jun Fukuyama)
DAIZ (formerly known as BACKDROP, back-up unit of female voice acting unit DROPS, with Takahiro Mizushima)
DD (a singing unit, with Daisuke Namikawa)
Nazo no Shin Unit STA☆MEN (with fellow voice actor friends Junichi Suwabe, Kenichi Suzumura, Hiroki Takahashi, Makoto Yasumura, Kosuke Toriumi and Hiroyuki Yoshino)
Stella Quintet (with fellow Kin'iro no Corda main casts Jun Fukuyama, Kentarou Itou, Masakazu Morita, Kishou Taniyama and Mamoru Miyano)

Filmography

Television animation
1996
Mizuiro Jidai – Myau
Boys Over Flowers – Male Student C (ep 1)

1998
Crayon Shin-chan – Young Man

1999
Kaikan Phrase – Mizuki
Surfside High School – Yasuhira Nagashima
Zoids – Van

2000
Kindaichi Shounen no Jikenbo – Makoto Matsuda
Doraemon – Referee
Pokémon – Noboru

2001
Inuyasha – Villager
Haré+Guu – Wadi, Young Man
Star Ocean EX – Hooligan A, "Chin", Young Man A
Zone of the Enders – Larry
Beyblade – Pedro
Hikaru no Go – Itou

2002
Inuyasha – Imp
G-On Riders – Man A
The Prince of Tennis – Fukushi Michiru
Duel Masters – Kyōshirō Kokujō
Nintama Rantaro – Omo
Happy Lesson – Chitose Hitotose
Forza! Mario – Joe
Pokémon – Saburou
Detective Conan – Noburo Ikema

2003
Ashita no Nadja – Thomas O'Brian
Astro Boy – Jiro
Atashnn'chi – Yuzuhiko's Friend #3
Stellvia – Kent Austin
D.C. ~Da Capo~ – Suginami
Nintama Rantaro – Nintama
Happy Lesson Advanced – Chitose Hitotose
Mermaid Melody: Pichi Pichi Pitch – Kaito Domoto, Gaito, Fourth Tachi Brother
Tank Knights Portriss – Multikokopa
Rockman.EXE Axess – Tomoharu

2004
Azusa, Otetsudai Shimasu! – Wataru Hanashima
School Rumble – Kyōsuke Imadori
Duel Masters Charge – Kyōshirō Kokujō
Doraemon – Bonasu
Transformers: Energon – Kicker
B-Legend! Battle Bedaman – Enju
Final Approach – Ryo Mizuhara
Futari wa Pretty Cure – Shougo Fujimura
Black Jack – Big Mask
Pokémon Advance – Satoru
Bobobo-bo Bo-bobo – Hatenkou, 6/U-kun
Rockman.EXE Stream – Gyroman

2005
Izumo: Takeki Tsurugi no Senki – Kagutsuchi
Okusama wa Maho Shojo – Tatsumi Kagura
Gaiking: Legend of Daikū-maryū – Nouza, Franklin
Gunparade Orchestra – Yuki Makihara
Cluster Edge – Fon Aina Sulfur
D.C.S.S. ~Da Capo Second Season~ – Suginami
Doraemon – Navi Robot
Happy Seven – Kouji Sakagami
Battle B-Daman: Fire Spirits – Enju
Futari wa Pretty Cure Max Heart – Shougo Fujimura
Bleach – Hinagiku
Pokémon Advance – Kyoutarou

2006
Kamisama Kazoku – Samatarō Kamiyama
La Corda D'Oro – Azuma Yunoki
Hell Girl: Two Mirrors – Kei Takada
School Rumble: 2nd Semester – Kyōsuke Imadori
Demashitaa! Powerpuff Girls Z – Takaaki
Tokimeki Memorial ~Only Love~ – Ryuichi Yagen
Binbō Shimai Monogatari – Masao Ichinokura
Yoake Mae Yori Ruri Iro Na -Crescent Love- – Jin Takamizawa
One Piece – Young Iceberg

2007
Ayakashi – Yū Kusaka
D.C. II: Da Capo II – Suginami
Duel Masters Zero – Kyōshirō Kokujō
Big Windup! – Miyakawa, Aoi, Ryō
Dennō Coil – 4423/Nobuhiko Amasawa
Dojin Work – Ryuichirō Hoshi
Hitohira – Kai Nishida
Heroic Age – Meleaguros
Bleach – Luppi

2008
Vampire Knight – Kaname Kuran
Vampire Knight Guilty – Kaname Kuran
Gunslinger Girl: Il Teatrino – Pinocchio
Gegege no Kitarō – Po, Shinji
Junjou Romantica – Shinobu Takatsuki
Junjou Romantica 2 – Shinobu Takatsuki
Tytania – Jouslain Tytania
D.C.II S.S. ~Da Capo II Second Season~ – Suginami
D.Gray-man – Howard Link
Duel Masters Cross – Kyōshirō Kokujō
Rosario + Vampire – Tsukune Aono
Rosario + Vampire Capu2 – Tsukune Aono

2009
Atashinchi – Fish Seller
Inuyasha: The Final Act –  Hakkaku
Cross Game – Keiichirō Senda
Guin Saga – Flay
07-Ghost – Konatsu
Tayutama: Kiss on my Deity – Ouryuu
Tegami Bachi: Letter Bee – Zazie Winters
A Certain Magical Index – Mitsuki Unabara
Doraemon – Mecha Jiro
Dragon Ball Kai – Jheese
Battle Spirits: Shōnen Toppa Bashin – Nanao "Seven" Watanabe/Galaxy Seven
Fairy Tail – Loki, Toby
Yatterman – Sein De Medachi
Yumeiro Pâtissière – Henri Lucas
Live On Cardliver Kakeru – Sakeru Yamaga

2010
Gokyōdai Monogatari – Male Store Attendant
The Book of Bantorra – Dulltom
Tantei Opera Milky Holmes – Twenty
Tegami Bachi: Reverse – Zazie Winters
Digimon Fusion – Zenjirou Tsurugi, Beelzebumon, Blastmon, GrandisKuwagamon, Mailbirdramon
Duel Masters Cross Shock – Kokojo
Durarara!! – Kasuka Heiwajima
Tono to Issho – Nobuyuki Sanada
Fairy Tail – Scorpio
Yumeiro Pâtissière SP Professional – Henri Lucas

2011
Gintama' – Nakasaki
Digimon Xros Wars: The Young Hunters Who Leapt Through Time – Dracmon, Gigabreakdramon, Zenjirō Tsurugi, Betsumon, Guard B, MetalTyrannomon, Sephirotmon, Student, Yashamon, Zenimon
A Certain Magical Index II – Mitsuki Unabara
Tono to Issho: Gantai no Yabō – Nobuyuki Sanada
Nura: Rise of the Yokai Clan: Demon Capital – Itaku
Hunter × Hunter – Hanzo
Phi-Brain - Puzzle of God – Yuuichi Aizawa
Beelzebub – Shintarō Natsume
Rio: Rainbow Gate! – Carlos Tanaka

2012
Aikatsu! – Hiro
The Knight in the Area – Leonardo Silva (Young)
Kamisama Kiss – Kurama
Cross Fight B-Daman eS – Kreis Reidora
Is This a Zombie? of the Dead – Takeshi Kurisu
Tantei Opera Milky Holmes Dai-Ni-Maku – Twenty
Chōyaku Hyakunin Isshu: Uta Koi – Fujiwara no Kinto
Doraemon – Chance Manufacturer
Battle Spirits: Heroes – Renard William Ardley
Hyōka – Kazuya Tayama
Phi-Brain - Puzzle of God: The Orpheus Order – Yūichi Aizawa
Robotics;Notes – Genki Dotō

2013
Samurai Flamenco – Delta Horse
Sparrow's Hotel – Misono-kun
D.C.III ~Da Capo III~ – Suginami
DD Fist of the North Star – Rei
Phi Brain - Kami no Puzzle – Yūichi Aizawa
Blood Lad – Goyle
Detective Conan – Jun Kouda
Meganebu! – Maximilian Takahashi
Yowamushi Pedal – Junta Teshima

2014
Inari Kon Kon – Macho Man
Cardfight!! Vanguard G – Jaime Alcaraz
La Corda d'Oro Blue Sky – Arata Mizushima
Shōnen Hollywood - Holly Stage for 49 – Ryūnosuke Date
JoJo's Bizarre Adventure: Stardust Crusaders – Steely Dan
Pretty Guardian Sailor Moon Crystal – Jadeite
Marvel Disk Wars: The Avengers – Bucky
DRAMAtical Murder – Takahashi
Laughing Under the Clouds – Kagemitsu Kumo
Mushishi: The Next Chapter – Isaza
Yowamushi Pedal Grande Road – Junta Teshima
World Trigger – Yōsuke Yoneya

2015
Cardfight!! Vanguard G GIRS Crisis – Jaime Alcaraz
Kamisama Kiss 2 – Kurama
Junjou Romantica 3 – Shinobu Takatsuki
Shōnen Hollywood - Holly Stage for 50 – Ryūnosuke Date
Tantei Kageki Milky Holmes TD – Twenty
Diabolik Lovers More, Blood – Azusa Mukami
Durarara!!×2 Shō – Kasuka Heiwajima
Durarara!! ×2 The Second Arc – Kasuka Heiwajima
Makura no Danshi – Yonaga Sagiri

2016
Dragon Ball Super – Cabba
Mysterious Joker 3rd Season – President D
B-Project: Kodou*Ambitious – Ryūji Korekuni
Danganronpa 3: The End of Hope's Peak High School – Fuyuhiko Kuzuryu
Tales of Zestiria the X – Rokuro Rangetsu
Tiger Mask W – Ryū Wakamatsu
Nanbaka – Elf
One Piece – Vito

2017
Yowamushi Pedal: New Generation – Junta Teshima
Nobunaga no Shinobi – Asakura Yoshikage
Dragon Ball Super – Nigrisshi
Clean Freak! Aoyama kun – Hikaru Tada
In Another World With My Smartphone – Naitō Masatoyo
Fastest Finger First – Minoru Hanabusa
My Hero Academia – Togaru Kamakiri

2018
Sanrio Boys – Yamato Machida
Yowamushi Pedal: Glory Line - Junta Teshima
Junji Ito Collection – Iwasaki
Tokyo Ghoul:re – Nimura Furuta
Inazuma Eleven: Orion no Kokuin - Satan Gaul

2019
B-Project: Zecchō Emotion – Ryūji Korekuni
Ace Attorney Season 2 - Takamasa Moroheiya
Zoids Wild Zero - Luc
Case File nº221: Kabukicho - Gregory Lastrade
One Piece –  Denjiro (Kyoshiro)

2020
Super HxEros – Rumba

2021
Heaven's Design Team – Kanamori
Shadows House – Ryan
 Kemono Jihen – Yoruno

Original video animation (OVA)
Angelique: Shiroi Tsubasa no Memoire First Part (????) – Man
Angel's Feather I (????) – Naoto Aoki
CLUSTER EDGE Secret Episode (????) – Fon Aina Sulfur
Detroit Metal City (????) – Souichi Negishi
Doukyuusei 2 (????) – Sanshirou
New Fist of the North Star (????) – Young Seiji
Fist of the North Star: The Legends of the True Savior movie series (????) – Young Jagi
Futari no Joe (????) – Joe Akamine
Garo: The Animation (????) – Tobias
Hanayaka Nari, Waga Ichizoku: Kinetograph (????) – Hiroshi Miyanomori
Happy Lesson THE FINAL (????) – Chitose Hitotose
Haré+Guu DELUXE (????) 
Haré+Guu FINAL (????) 
Memories Off 5 Togireta Film THE ANIMATION (????) – Shūji Ozu
Vulgar Ghost Daydream (????) – Mitsuru Fujiwara

Theatrical animation
Blade of the Phantom Master (2004) – Mong Ryong
Futari wa Pretty Cure Max Heart (2005) – Shōgo Fujimura (Fuji-P)
Futari wa Precure Max Heart 2: Yukizora no Tomodachi (2005) – Shōgo Fujimura (Fuji-P)
Hana Yori Dango (????) – Man in the park
Hurdle (????) – Leon Arisawa
Naruto: Shippūden the Movie (2007) – Susuki
RockMan.exe Stream Hikari to Yami no Program (2005) – Gyroman
Pia Carrot e Youkoso!! - Sayaka no Koi Monogatari (????) – Noboru Kinoshita
Doraemon: Nobita's Great Battle of the Mermaid King (2010) – Guard
Hells (2008) - Ryu Kuto

Video games
Inazuma Eleven (2008) – Sakuma Jirou
Dragon Ball: Raging Blast (2009) – Jeice
Super Street Fighter IV (2010) – Cody
Dragon Ball Z: Tenkaichi Tag Team (2010) – Jeice
Dragon Ball: Raging Blast 2 (2010) – Jeice
Dragon Ball Z: Ultimate Tenkaichi (2011) – Jeice
Final Fantasy XIII-2 (2011) – Noel Kreiss
Street Fighter X Tekken (2012) – Cody
Lightning Returns: Final Fantasy XIII (2013) – Noel Kreiss
Dragon Ball Z: Battle of Z (2014) – Jeice
Granblue Fantasy (2014) - Will, Nezha
Dragon Ball Xenoverse (2015) – Jeice
Project X Zone 2 (2015) – Hotsuma
Dragon Ball Xenoverse 2 (2016) – Jeice, Cabba
Dragon Ball FighterZ (2018) – Jeice
Street Fighter V: Arcade Edition (2018) – Cody
Arknights (2022) – Corroserum
Da Capo 5 (2023) – Suginami

Angel's Feather series – Naoto Aoki
Aoi Namida – MAN
Another Century's Episode 2 – Tack Capford
Baten Kaitos: Eternal Wings and the Lost Ocean – Lyude
Bleach: Blade Battlers 2nd – Luppi
Cluster Edge ~Kimi wo Matsu Mirai e no Akashi~ – Fon Aina Sulfer
Dark Chronicle – Rococo
DEAR My SUN!! ~Musuko★Ikusei★Capriccio~ – Satoru Tatsunami
Diabolik Lovers More, Blood – Azusa Mukami 
Digimon Story: Cyber Sleuth as Arata Sanada
Digimon Story: Cyber Sleuth - Hacker's Memory as Arata Sanada
Dynasty Warriors 7 – Sima Zhao
Dynasty Warriors 8 – Sima Zhao
Enchanted Arms – Atsuma
Full House Kiss Series – Haruta Yamamoto
Gakuen Heaven 2: Double Scramble (2014) - Kiyotada Jokawa ("Joker")
Gensou Suikoden V – Kyle, Fuwalafuwalu
Granblue Fantasy – Will
Grand Knights History – King Leon
Gunparade Orchestra Series – Yuki Makihara
Gunparade Orchestra Midori no Shou ~Ookami to Kare to Shōnen
Gunparade Orchestra Ao no Shou ~Hikari no Umi kara Tegami wo Okurimasu~
Hakare na Heart Series – Nanahoshi Himemiya
Hakare na Heart ~Ta ga tame ni Kimi wa aru?~
Hakare na Heart ~Kimi ga tame ni Kagayaki wo~
HARD LUCK – Dauglass Brantley
Ijiwaru My Master – Eins
 Inazuma Eleven (2008) - Sakuma Jirō 
Jak II – Erol
Kenka Banchou Series
Kenka Banchou – Shigeru Hachiya
Kenka Banchou 2 Full Throttle – Tomoya Takeda
Kin'iro no Corda series – Azuma Yunoki 
Kiniro no Corda 3 — Arata Mizushima
Kiniro no Corda 4 — Arata Mizushima
Kohitsuji Hokaku Keikaku! Sweet Boys Life – Shouta Morinaga
Kuu no Mori ~Tsuioku no Sumu Yakata~ – Yuuri Ayasegawa
Mana Khemia: Alchemists of Al-Revis – Roxis Rosenkranz
Memories Off 5 The Unfinished Film – Shuuji Ozu
Ore no Shita de Agake (PS2) – Nephilim
Palais de Reine Series – Dietrich
Palais de Reine
Palais de Royale
Prince of Tennis Card Hunter – Michiru Fukushi
Rockman ZX Series – Prometheus
SD Gundam G Generation Spirits – Job John, Tony Gene
Shikigami no Shiro Series – Koutarou Kuga
Shikigami no Shiro II
Shikigami no Shiro III
Shinobi – Hotsuma
Shōnen Onmyōji -Tsubasa yo ima, Sora ni Kaere- – Hon-u
Sonic the Hedgehog series – Jet the Hawk
Sonic Riders
Sonic Riders: Zero Gravity
Sonic Free Riders
Soumatou – Albert, Marco
Sly Cooper – Bentley the Turtle
Star Ocean: The Last Hope – Edge Maverick
Starry Sky – Haruki Naoshi
Suikoden Tierkreis – Roberto
Summon Night Series
Summon Night 2 – Magna
Summon Night: Swordcraft Story 2 – Magna, Kuuya
Summon Night Twin Age: Seireitachi no Koe – Mirusaato, Kaui
Danganronpa 2: Goodbye Despair – Fuyuhiko Kuzuryuu
Sweet Pool – Makoto Mita
Tales of Berseria - Rokurou Rangetsu
Tales of Graces - Segan
Tenerezza – Indy
Tokimeki Restaurant – Otowa Shinnosuke
Trouble Fortune COMPANY☆Happy CURE – Michizumi Kuze
True Love Story 3 – Minoru Kubota
Under The Moon – Sena Amamiya
VitaminX Series – Goro Fuumonji
Vampire Knight Otome Game for the DS – Kaname Kuran
VitaminX
VitaminX Evolution
VitaminY
VM JAPAN – Setsuha
Warriors Orochi 2 – Taikoubou (Taigong Wang)
Warriors Orochi 3 – Taikoubou (Taigong Wang)
Wild Arms 4 - Scythe

Tokusatsu
2000
Mirai Sentai Timeranger – Serial Thief Dorpa (ep. 41)
2003
Bakuryu Sentai Abaranger – Bakuryu Dimenokodon (eps. 13 - 50)
Bakuryū Sentai Abaranger DELUXE: Abare Summer is Freezing Cold! –Bakuryu Dimenokodon
2004
Bakuryū Sentai Abaranger vs. Hurricaneger – Bakuryu Dimenokodon
2005
Chousei Kantai Sazer-X – Window General Cyclead
2012
Tokumei Sentai Go-Busters – Kentateloid (Kenloid (Tateloid Voice by Kanae Oki)) (ep. 43)
2018
Kaitou Sentai Lupinranger VS Keisatsu Sentai Patranger – Doryun Sanbu (ep. 35)

Drama CDs

Aijin Incubus – Fujimaru Senda
Akiyama-kun – Daisuke Shiba
Corsair series – Letius 'Leti' Mia Farless
Damasaretai – Misato Tamura
Danshi Meiro – Nobuya Ooyama
Denkou Sekka Boys – Natsui Kodaka
Diabolik Lovers series - Azusa Mukami
Goshujinsama to Inu – Mamoru Anzai
Gouka Kyakusen de Koi wa Hajimaru series 4, 5, 7, 8 – Franz
Haruyama no Koi – Shino
Himitsu no Kateikyoushi – Kitai
Honey Boys Spiral – Hinato Yoshihara
Kairyuu Gakuen Twins series 1: Scandalous Twins – Kazumi Kitashiro
Kairyuu Gakuen Twins series 2: Dangerous Twins – Kazumi Kitashiro
Konoyo Ibun Series 1: Konoyo Ibun – Yamane Akio
Konoyo Ibun Series 2: Sono no San – Yamane Akio
Konoyo Ibun Series 3: Kitsune No Yomeiri – Yamane Akio
Kubisuji ni Kiss ~Hong Kong Yakyoku~ – Korue
Lip On My Prince – Tomoe Naruse
Mayonaka ni Oai Shimashou – Ai Kaidouji
Naito wa Oatsuinoga Osuki series 1 – Kazumi Kitashiro, Crystal-cat
Naito wa Oatsuinoga Osuki series 2: Naito wa Hageshiinoga Osuki – Kazumi Kitashiro
Ouchou Haru no Yoi no Romance – Senjumaru
Prime Time – Shin Kashiwagi
Punch Up! – Kouta Ooki
Recipe – Kou Ichihara
Saa Koi ni Ochitamae – Sakashita Noboru
Saihate no Kimi e – Ryou
Samejima-kun to Sasahara-kun – Sasahara
Sentimental Garden Lover – Shima (Cat)
Seraph of the End – Mikaela Hyakuya
Shounen Yonkei
Sokubaku no Aria – Takato Shibazaki
Trap series 4: Aiyoku Trap
Ushi Dorobou – Tokuma Tanaka
Uwasa no Futari – Narumi
Vassalord - Barry
Wagamama Kitchen – Kumaki
Yuiga Dokuson na Otoko – Neil
Yume wa Kirei ni Shidokenaku – Ai Ichinomiya
Yuuransen – Biyori Touzai?

Radio
Listed in chronological order:
Starchild Hour – Radio no Stellvia
Hosts: Ai Nonaka, Daisuke Kishio
Broadcast dates: 5 October 2003 to 28 March 2004 (JOQR, etc)
Ah, Cluster Gakuen!
Hosts: Hiro Shimono, Jun Fukuyama, Daisuke Kishio, Hiroyuki Yoshino
Broadcast dates: 7 October 2005 to 23 June 2006 (Bandai Visual BEAT Net Radio!)
Full House Kiss 2 Konya Boku ga Soulmate!
Host: Daisuke Kishio
Broadcast dates: 13 January 2006 to 31 March 2006 (Capcom web radio)
Haikyo Party Radio
Hosts: Daisuke Kishio, Junko Minagawa, Daisuke Namikawa, Sayaka Oohara, Fumiko Orikasa, Junichi Suwabe
Broadcast dates: 2 June 2006 to 14 July 2006 (Bandai Visual BEAT Net Radio!)
Kochira Munekyun Otome
Host: Daisuke Kishio
Broadcast dates: 2 May 2007 to 31 January 2008 (Animate.TV web radio)
Sugar Beans Housoukyoku
Hosts: Daisuke Hirakawa, Daisuke Kishio
Broadcast dates: 20 May 2007 to present (Sugar Beans web radio)
Junjou Triangle ~Iza, Junjou ni Shoubu!!~
Hosts: Hikaru Hanada, Kentarou Itou, Daisuke Kishio
Broadcast dates: 17 January 2008 to present (Animate.TV web radio)

Dubbing

Live-action
Addams Family Reunion – Stevie Addams
Air America – Pablo
The Assassination of Gianni Versace: American Crime Story – Andrew Cunanan (Darren Criss)
Big Fat Liar – Bret Callaway (Taran Killam)
Blast from the Past – Jason
Boy Meets World – Jason Marsden (Jason Marsden)
Burning – Lee Jong-su (Yoo Ah-in)
Cannibal! The Musical – George Noon (Dian Bachar)
Confessions of a Teenage Drama Queen – Sam (Eli Marienthal)
Crazy/Beautiful – Eddie
Das Boot – Fähnrich Ullmann (Martin May)
Drive Me Crazy – Dave Ignazzi (Mark Webber)
Ed – Warren Cheswick (Justin Long)
Edges of the Lord – Robal
The Escapist – Joey
Freaks and Geeks – Bill Haverchuck (Martin Starr)
The Girl Next Door – Eli (Chris Marquette)
Glee – Blaine Anderson (Darren Criss)
Hansel and Gretel – Raven (Sinbad)
Harry Potter and the Prisoner of Azkaban – Stan Shunspike (Lee Ingleby)
High School Musical series – Zeke Baylor (Chris Warren Jr.)
I'll Be Home for Christmas – The Murph-Man
In Good Company – Carter Duryea (Topher Grace)
The Invisible – Pete Egan (Chris Marquette)
The Karate Kid – Billy
Life with Derek – Derek Venturi (Michael Seater)
The Mighty – Maxwell Kane (Elden Henson)
Monster Hunt – Song Tianyin (Jing Boran)
Outlander – Alex Randall
Planet of the Apes – Birn (Lucas Elliot Eberl)
Primeval – Jojo
The Queen – Tony Blair (Michael Sheen)
Red Dwarf – Hitler (Ryan Gage)
Riding the Bullet – Alan Parker (Jonathan Jackson)
Santa's Slay – Nicolas Yuleson (Douglas Smith)
The Skulls – Sullivan
The Sorcerer and the White Snake – Neng Ren (Wen Zhang)
A Star Is Born – Rez Gavron (Rafi Gavron)
Supernatural – Craig Thurston (Shane Meier)
Sweet Sixteen – Pinball (William Ruane)
Yours, Mine & Ours – Dylan North (Drake Bell)

Animation
Dave the Barbarian – Dave
Gumby: The Movie – Prickle
Ratatouille – Remy
Robotboy – Bjorn Bjornson
South Park episode "Pip" – Herbert Pocket
Transformers: Animated – Bumblebee
Transformers: Robots in Disguise – Quillfire

Puppetry
Sherlock Holmes – Gordon Lestrade, Stamford

Discography

Mini-albums

References

External links
  
 

1974 births
Living people
Aoni Production voice actors
Horipro artists
Japanese male video game actors
Japanese male voice actors
Japanese male pop singers
Male voice actors from Mie Prefecture
Musicians from Mie Prefecture
Tokyo Actor's Consumer's Cooperative Society voice actors
Victor Entertainment artists
20th-century Japanese male actors
21st-century Japanese male actors
21st-century Japanese singers
21st-century Japanese male singers